The Food Museum, formerly the Museum of East Anglian Life, is a museum in Stowmarket, Suffolk, England, which specialises in presenting the agricultural history of East Anglia through a mixture of exhibits and living history demonstrations.

History of the Museum

The land was originally part of the Home Farm for the Abbot’s Hall estate. The estate dates from medieval times, when it was an outlying manor for St Osyth's Priory in Essex. It passed through numerous owners until it was purchased by the Longe family in 1903.

Mechanisation in the 1950s and 1960s meant that England was in danger of losing long-established skills, equipment, and buildings, if something was not done to rescue them. Local farmer Jack Carter, the Suffolk Local History Council, and other individuals worked to collect, preserve and display objects from rural East Anglia. After several years of temporary exhibitions, Vera and Ena Longe placed  of farmland, Abbot’s Hall, its gardens, and 18/20 Crowe Street, in trust to be used as a museum. The Museum opened in 1967.

In April 2022, the museum was renamed The Food Museum, a controversial move.

Buildings

The Museum has various buildings on its  site, including:
 Abbot's Hall — each room explores a different notion of home and belonging in East Anglia. Home is defined in this exhibit as the physical place where we live, but also our sense of belonging to a place.
Edgar's farmhouse — a 14th-century aisled farmhouse "discovered" in Combs, just south of Stowmarket, and incorporated into a much larger farmhouse dating from the Victorian era. Saved from demolition in 1970, it was the first historic building to be re-erected on the museum site. Evidence suggests that the Adgors survived the Black Death and prospered. The building is Grade II* listed.
 Crowe Street Cottages — the last pair of workers' cottages to remain as part of the Abbot's Hall Estate. 
 Boby Building — features exhibitions of agricultural engines and individual craft workshops, a working printing press and a cinema. In July 1985, a team of apprentices assembled a Whitmore and Binyon horizontal condensing steam-engine in the building, which had previously been located at the mill of Reuben Rackham (1842-1924) in Wickham Market. It is believed to be the only Whitmore and Binyon steam engine on public display.
 William Bone Building — an exhibition on the history of the Ransomes company in East Anglia.
Eastbridge Windpump — a windpump used for draining land in the 19th century.
Alton Watermill — an 18th-century watermill which was used to grind corn. Like many of the museum buildings, it was taken apart and then transported to the museum where it was reassembled. The watermill was moved to prevent it being destroyed by the Alton Water Reservoir.

The museum also has two huts depicting scenes of shops, kitchens, and living rooms of the 1950s, and a Victorian schoolroom.

Restoration of Abbot's Hall
The museum was awarded a grant from the Heritage Lottery Fund to renovate Abbot's Hall and Crowe Street Cottages. The project was completed in April 2012, and officially opened in June 2012. There are nine exhibition spaces exploring ideas of home and belonging in East Anglia, as well as space for temporary exhibitions. Crowe Street Cottages, which were occupied by workers at Abbot's Hall, have been displayed as they would have looked when the last owner lived there.

Abbot's Hall is open year round, providing a permanent centrepiece to the museum. The Hall features a permanent exhibition of the life and works of Welsh folklorist George Ewart Evans.

Events
Since 2011 the museum site has hosted the Stowblues Festival. The festival is organised in partnership with BBC Radio Suffolk.

In August 2016 the Museum began hosting its biggest event to date, the annual East Anglian Living History Fayre run in partnership with Black Knight Historical.

References

External links

Museum Website

Museums in Suffolk
Open-air museums in England
Local museums in Suffolk
Agricultural museums in England
Steam museums in England
Museums established in 1967
Museum of East Anglian Life
Museum of East Anglian Life